The 3rd World Sports Acrobatics Championships were held in Sofia, Bulgaria, in 1978.

Men's

Tumbling

Overall

First exercise

Second exercise

Group

Overall

First exercise

Second exercise

Pair

Overall

First exercise

Second exercise

Mixed

Pair

Overall

First exercise

Second exercise

Women

Tumbling

Overall

First exercise

Second exercise

Group

Overall

First exercise

Second exercise

Pair

Overall

First exercise

Second exercise

References

Acrobatic Gymnastics Championships
Acrobatic Gymnastics World Championships
International gymnastics competitions hosted by Bulgaria
1978 in Bulgarian sport